Mnemeiosaurus is an extinct genus of dinocephalian therapsids. Its only identified species is Mnemeiosaurus jubilaei. Both were named by Franz Nopcsa von Felső-Szilvás in 1923.

See also

 List of therapsids

References

 The main groups of non-mammalian synapsids at Mikko's Phylogeny Archive

Dinocephalian genera
Prehistoric synapsids of Asia
Prehistoric synapsids of Europe
Taxa named by Franz Nopcsa von Felső-Szilvás